Luffariella is a genus of sea sponges in the family Thorectidae.

One of its species is one of the few organisms that synthesizes derivatives of cyclopentanepentol.

Species 
The following species are recognised in the genus Luffariella:
Luffariella caliculata Bergquist, 1995
Luffariella cylindrica Bergquist, 1995
Luffariella geometrica Kirkpatrick, 1900
Luffariella herdmani (Dendy, 1905)
Luffariella koreana  Sim, Lee & Kim, 2017
Luffariella tubula Sim, Lee & Kim, 2017
Luffariella variabilis (Polejaeff, 1884)

References

   

Thorectidae
Sponge genera